Eresina katangana is a butterfly in the family Lycaenidae. It is found in the Democratic Republic of the Congo (Lualaba) and Zambia. Its habitat consists of dense, primary forests.

References

Butterflies described in 1956
Poritiinae